Ciryack Olivier Dhauholou (born 6 June 1997) is an Ivorian professional footballer who plays as a forward.

Professional career
On 3 September 2019, Dhauholou signed with Waasland-Beveren, on loan from Anderlecht. Dhauholou made his professional debut for Waasland-Beveren in a 4-0 Belgian First Division A loss to Royal Antwerp F.C. on 6 December 2019.

References

External links

RTL Profile

1997 births
Living people
Ivorian footballers
Ivorian expatriate footballers
Association football forwards
R.S.C. Anderlecht players
S.K. Beveren players
Belgian Pro League players
Ivorian expatriate sportspeople in Belgium
Expatriate footballers in Belgium